Paphiopedilum superbiens is a species of orchid endemic to northern and western Sumatra.

References

superbiens
Flora of Sumatra